The Lincoln School for Nurses, also known  as Lincoln Hospital and Nursing Home School for Nurses, and Lincoln Hospital School of Nursing, was the first nursing school for African-American women in New York City.  It existed from 1898 to 1961. It was founded by Lincoln Hospital (then named The Home for the Colored Aged) in Manhattan. The hospital and nursing school, moved to 141st Street, between Concord Avenue and Southern Boulevard in Mott Haven, the South Bronx, after 1899.

History 

The Lincoln School School for Nurses was the first (and only) nursing school for African-American women in New York City, until the municipally funded Harlem Hospital School of Nursing was established in 1923.
The Lincoln School School for Nurses' first graduating class was in 1900, with a total of six graduates.
From 1906 to 1923 Adah Belle Thoms, a 1905 graduate, served as acting director. In 1908, she, along with Martha Minerva Franklin, and Mary Eliza Mahoney, organized the first meeting of the National Association of Colored Graduate Nurses, which was sponsored by the Lincoln School for Nurses Alumnae Association.

The 1914 demographics of the hospital and nursing school has been reported as: the hospital patients were primarily white; the nursing home patients were primarily black; the doctors were white males; and the nurses and nursing students were black females. 

In 1928 Isabel Maitland Stewart directed the first university-sponsored studies in nursing using a research team approach. What made the survey unique was that it focused on both the nursing process and results of care in terms of patient comfort and safety.

Notable alumni 

 Ianthe Blyden attended in 1946.
 Florence Edmonds attended in 1917-1919.
 Mary Elizabeth Carnegie attended in 1932-1936.  Former president of the American Academy of Nursing.
 Martha Minerva Franklin post-graduate course in 1928.
 Florence S. Gaynor graduated in 1946. Executive director of Sydenham Hospital, and a director at Meharry Medical College.
 Millie Essie Gibson Hale founded Millie E. Hale Hospital in Nashville, Tennessee .
 Lillian Holland Harvey graduated in 1939. Dean of Tuskegee Institute Training School of Nurses.
 Nella Larsen graduated in 1915. Novelist, nurse, librarian. She was involved in the Harlem Renaissance.
 Hulda Margaret Lyttle attended in 1913-1914. Dean of Meharry Medical College's School of Nursing.
 Adah Belle Thoms graduated in 1905. Acting director of the school from 1906 - 1923.
 Helen Turner Watson graduated in 1939. Professor of nursing at the University of Connecticut.

See also 
 Estelle Massey Osborne an instructor at the school.
 Hunter-Bellevue School of Nursing established 1873.
 Columbia University School of Nursing established 1892.
 Harlem Hospital School of Nursing established 1923. The second New York City nursing school to accept African-American women.
 National Association of Colored Graduate Nurses established 1908. Dissolved in 1951.

References

Bibliography 
 Hutchinson, George (2006), In Search of Nella Larsen: A Biography of the Color Line, Harvard University Press.

External links 
 The Lincoln School for Nurses collection 1840-2011 at the New York Public Library
 Lincoln School For Nurses Photograph Collection at the New York Public Library

Nursing schools in New York City
Universities and colleges in the Bronx
Historically black universities and colleges in the United States
Educational institutions established in 1898
1898 establishments in New York City
African-American history in New York City